Wila is an extinct town in New Madrid County, in the U.S. state of Missouri. 

A post office called Wila was established in 1894, and remained in operation until 1898. A variant name was "Wiley". The community derives its name from Wiley Webb, the son of a local merchant.

References

Ghost towns in Missouri
Former populated places in New Madrid County, Missouri